Basketball is a team sport in which two teams of five players try to score points by throwing or "shooting" a ball through the top of a basketball hoop while following a set of rules. Basketball is one of the most popular and widely viewed sports in the world.

Following is an alphabetical index of basketball articles:

0–9 
 1-3-1 defense/offense
 1946–47 BAA season
 1947–48 BAA season
 1948–49 BAA season
 1949–50 NBA season
 1950–51 NBA season
 1951–52 NBA season
 1952–53 NBA season
 1953–54 NBA season
 1954–55 NBA season
 1955–56 NBA season
 1956–57 NBA season
 1957–58 NBA season
 1958–59 NBA season
 1959–60 NBA season
 1960–61 NBA season
 1961–62 NBA season
 1962–63 NBA season
 1963–64 NBA season
 1964–65 NBA season
 1965–66 NBA season
 1966–67 NBA season
 1967–68 NBA season
 1968–69 NBA season
 1969–70 NBA season
 1970–71 NBA season
 1971–72 NBA season
 1972–73 NBA season
 1973–74 NBA season
 1974–75 NBA season
 1975–76 NBA season
 1976–77 NBA season
 1977–78 NBA season
 1978–79 NBA season
 1979–80 NBA season
 1980–81 NBA season
 1981–82 NBA season
 1982–83 NBA season
 1983–84 NBA season
 1984–85 NBA season
 1985–86 NBA season
 1986–87 NBA season
 1987–88 NBA season
 1988–89 NBA season
 1989–90 NBA season
 1990–91 NBA season
 1991–92 NBA season
 1992–93 NBA season
 1993–94 NBA season
 1994–95 NBA season
 1995–96 NBA season
 1996–97 NBA season
 1997–98 NBA season
 1998–99 NBA season
 1999–2000 NBA season
 2-3 zone defense
 2000–01 NBA season
 2001–02 NBA season
 2002–03 NBA season
 2003–04 NBA season
 2004–05 NBA season
 2005–06 NBA season
 2006–07 NBA season
 2007–08 NBA season
 2008–09 NBA season
 2009–10 NBA season
 2010–11 NBA season
 2010 IHSAA Boys Basketball Championship
 2011–12 NBA season
 2012–13 NBA season
 2013–14 NBA season
 2014–15 NBA season
 2015–16 NBA season
 3 point line
 5 man weave

A 
 Air ball
 All-Pro Basketball
 Allen Iverson
 Alley oop
 Arcade Hoops Basketball
 Arch Rivals
 Assist

B 
 Back screen
 Backboard
 Backboard shattering
 Ball game
 Ball hog
 Barkley Shut Up and Jam!
 Basket Master
 Basket interference
 Basketball
 Basketball (1978 video game)
 Basketball (1980 video game)
 Basketball (ball)
 Basketball Association of America
 Basketball Challenge
 Basketball court
 Basketball hoop
 Basketball moves
 Basketball Nightmare
 Basketball position
 Basketball sleeve
 Basketbrawl
 Beach Basketball
 Bill Laimbeer's Combat Basketball
 Block
 Block out
 Bonus
 Box-and-one defense
 Box out
 Box score
 Box set
 Breakaway rim
 Buzzer beater

C 
 Carrying
 Center
 Chris Webber
 Coach
 College basketball
 Combo Guard
 Continental Basketball Association
 Continuity offense
 Cornerman
 Crossover dribble

D 
 David Robinson's Supreme Court
 Deaf basketball
 Dean Smith
 Disabled sports
 Disney Sports Basketball
 Division I
 Don Nelson
 Donkey basketball
 Double-double
 Double Dribble: The Playoff Edition
 Double Dribble
 Double Dunk
 Double dribble
 Dribble
 Dribble drive motion
 Dribbling

E 
 Earl Monroe
 EuroGames
 Euroleague Basketball

F 
 FIBA 33
 Fantasy basketball
 Fast break
 Field goal
 Finger sleeve
 Five-second rule
 Flagrant foul
 Flex offense
 Fly fast break
 Forward-Center
 Foul
 Four-point play
 Four corners offense
 Franklin Cappon
 FreeStyle Street Basketball
 Free throw

G 
 GBA Championship Basketball: Two-on-Two
 Gay Games
 Goaltending
 Golden Basket

H 
 Hack-a-Shaq
 Halftime
 Harlem Globetrotters
 Harlem Globetrotters (video game)
 History of basketball
 HoopWorld
 Hoops (video game) 
 Horseball
 Hot hand fallacy

I 
 International Basketball Federation
 Isiah Thomas

J 
 James Naismith
 Jammit
 Jason Kidd
 Jason Williams (basketball, born 1975)
 Jordan Rules
 Jordan vs. Bird: One on One
 Jump ball
 Jump shot

K 
 Kareem Abdul-Jabbar
 Key
 Kidz Sports Basketball
 Korfball

L 
 Larry Bird
 Layup
 LeBron James
 Liga ACB
 List of Atlanta Hawks seasons
 List of Boston Celtics seasons
 List of Charlotte Bobcats seasons
 List of Chicago Bulls seasons
 List of Cleveland Cavaliers seasons
 List of Dallas Mavericks seasons
 List of Denver Nuggets seasons
 List of Detroit Pistons seasons
 List of Golden State Warriors seasons
 List of Houston Rockets seasons
 List of Indiana Pacers seasons
 List of Los Angeles Clippers seasons
 List of Los Angeles Lakers seasons
 List of Memphis Grizzlies seasons
 List of Miami Heat seasons
 List of Milwaukee Bucks seasons
 List of Minnesota Timberwolves seasons
 List of National Basketball Association seasons
 List of NBA franchise post-season droughts
 List of NBA franchise post-season streaks
 List of New Jersey Nets seasons
 List of New Orleans Pelicans seasons
 List of New York Knicks seasons
 List of Oklahoma City Thunder seasons
 List of Orlando Magic seasons
 List of Philadelphia 76ers seasons
 List of Phoenix Suns seasons
 List of Portland Trail Blazers seasons
 List of Sacramento Kings seasons
 List of San Antonio Spurs seasons
 List of Toronto Raptors seasons
 List of Utah Jazz seasons
 List of Washington Wizards seasons
 Looney Tunes B-Ball

M 
 Magic Johnson
 Magic Johnson's Basketball
 Man-to-man defense
 Mario Hoops 3-on-3
 Memphis Attack
 Memphis Tigers basketball (disambiguation)
 Mesoamerican ballgame
 Michael Jordan
 Michael Jordan in Flight
 Midnight basketball
 Motion offense

N 
 NBA
 NBA Elite series
 NBA Give 'n Go
 NBA Jam
 NBA in the Zone
 NCAA Men's Division I Basketball Championship
 NCAA Women's Division I Basketball Championship
 National Basketball Association
 National Collegiate Athletic Association
 National Collegiate Athletic Association
 National Federation of State High School Associations
 Native Americans in the United States
 Nellie ball
 Netball
 Nicktoons Basketball

O 
 Official (Basketball)
 One on One: Dr. J vs. Larry Bird

P 
 Pat Riley Basketball
 Personal foul
 Pete Carril
 Pete Maravich
 Philippines
 The Physics of Basketball
 Pick and pop
 Pick and roll
 Point forward
 Point guard
 Pok-a-tok
 Power forward
 Princeton Tigers men's basketball
 Princeton offense
 Prison Ball

Q 
 Quadruple-double

R 
 Rap Jam: Volume One
 Rebound
 Rebounds
 Rezball
 Rules of basketball
 Run and gun

S 
 Screen
 Shaquille O'Neal
 Shooting guard
 Shot clock
 Shuffle offense
 Six-on-six basketball
 Sixth man
 Slam City with Scottie Pippen
 Slam dunk
 Slamball
 Small Ball
 Small forward
 Space Jam
 Sport
 Stephen Curry
 Steve Nash
 Street Hoops
 Street Slam
 Street Sports Basketball
 Streetball
 Stutter step
 Swingman

T 
 Tammi Reiss
 TV Sports Basketball
 Team sport
 Technical foul
 The New York Times
 Three-peat
 Three-point field goal
 Three seconds rule
 Tim Hardaway
 Timeline of women's basketball history
 Tip Off
 Traveling
 Triangle and Two Defense
 Triangle offense
 Triple-double
 Turnover
 Tweener

U 
 UCLA High Post Offense
 UEFA Champions League
 UEFA Europa League
 ULEB
 ULEB Eurocup
 Ultimate Basketball
 Unicycle basketball
 Unsportsmanlike conduct

W 
 Water basketball
 Wheelchair basketball
 White Men Can't Jump
 Wii Sports Resort
 Wilt Chamberlain
 Women's National Basketball Association
 World Outgames

Z 
 Zone defense

See also 
 Outline of basketball
Basketball Jump Shooting

References